Howard Bashaw (born 1957, White Rock, Canada)  is a composer of acoustic music; and a Professor of Music at the University of Alberta.

Bashaw graduated as a Master of Music in 1984 and a Doctor of Musical Arts in 1989 from the University of British Columbia.   He also attended the Banff Centre for the Arts where he won the Banff Centre Concerto Competition in 1992. He teaches composition, orchestration, music theory and analysis at the University of Alberta, previously having taught at the University of British Columbia, and at the Université Canadienne en France, Nice.

Bashaw composes music for orchestras, ensembles, and piano soloist performances. He has released some of his own work on CD. The Alberta Foundation for the Arts, Canada Council for the Arts, and CBC Radio Music Department have commissioned his work. 

Bashaw is an Associate Composer of the Canadian Music Centre and a member of the Canadian League of Composers.

List of works
Piano
15 (2012)
Minimalisms II (2005)
Form Archimage (2001)
Preludes Book 2 (2000, revised 2003)
Preludes Book 1 (1996, revised 2007)
Hosu (1986, revised 2011)

Chamber
Music for Trumpet and Piano (2007)
Music for Alto Saxophone and Piano (2006)
Music for Trombone and Piano (1998)
Music for Organ and Piano (1995–96, revised 2007)
Music for Tuba and Piano (1984, revised 1989)
10M-5P-17m (2005) piano, violin, cello, clarinet, percussion
4T-XMP-14m (2002) Four Toccatas for Xylophone (or marimba) and Piano
12M-4P-15m (2001) piano, violin, cello, clarinet
Eolian Braid (1995) two pianos, marimba, vibraphone
seven spheres (1996) piano, clarinet, bass clarinet, trumpet, violin, cello, percussion
New Rage for Now Age (1996) piano, trumpet, trombone, percussion, saxophone
Timepieces (1993, revised 2006) piano, violin, cello, trumpet

Orchestra and large ensemble
Scratch-Scorch (2008), for Big Band, featuring amplified violin
TMHRO (2006) Three Movements for the Hard Rubber Orchestra, Big Band, featuring amplified piano
Concerto for Two Pianos and Two Percussion (1999) with full orchestra
Minimalisms (2003) 14 instruments – chamber concerto for piano and percussion
Music for the Cycle of Strength (2003) for 14 instruments
Double Entente (2002) for 13 instruments – featuring tuba and trombone
Horos (1994) 6 guitars and 6 double basses, or 1 guitar and 1 double bass with recorded tracks

Voice
Seven St. Maur Poems (2008) for soprano, violin, cello, piano and percussion
The Chapel (2007) for SATB choir

Further reading
Steenhuisen, Paul (2009); "Sonic Mosaics: Conversations with Composers"; Edmonton: University of Alberta Press  
Couroux, Marc (1999); "Corpus Hermeticum - Howard Bashaw"; infinit.net
Poole, Elissa (2004);  "Complex structures:  Howard Bashaw's music plays with the organization of time";  Words & Music
Steenhuisen, Paul; "Bashaw - various works" review; paulsteenhuisen.com

References

External links
"Walter Boudreau : Sax, Drums & Co." www.scena.org; 2003-11-05
Art Music Promotion website

Academic staff of the University of Alberta
Canadian composers
Canadian male composers
1957 births
Living people